Yul is a given name and surname.  Notable people with the name include:

Given name
Yul Anderson, American pianist, guitarist and singer
Yul Arzú (born 1986), Honduran football goalkeeper
Yul Brynner (1920–1985), Russian-American actor
Yul Bürkle (born 1974), Venezuelan actor and model
Yul Edochie (born 1982), Nigerian actor
Yul Kwon (born 1975), Korean-American television personality
Yul Moldauer (born 1996), American artistic gymnast
Yul Vazquez (born 1965), Cuban-American actor

Yul as a given name in Korea 
Choi Yul (born 1949), South Korean activist, environmentalist and organizer
Kwon Yul (1537–1599), Korean general
Kwon Yul (actor), stage name of Korean actor Kwon Se-in (born 1982)